The PSA World Series 2011 is a series of men's squash tournaments which are part of the Professional Squash Association (PSA) World Tour for the 2011 squash season. The PSA World Series tournaments are some of the most prestigious events on the men's tour. The best-performing players in the World Series events qualify for the annual 2011 PSA World Series Finals tournament. Amr Shabana won his first PSA World Series Squash Finals trophy, beating Grégory Gaultier in the final.

PSA World Series Ranking Points
PSA World Series events also have a separate World Series ranking.  Points for this are calculated on a cumulative basis after each World Series event. The top eight players at the end of the calendar year are then eligible to play in the PSA World Series Finals.

2011 Tournaments

World Series Standings 2011

Bold – The first eight players present for the final

See also
PSA World Tour 2011
PSA World Series
Official Men's Squash World Ranking

References

External links 
 World Series Series Squash website
 World Series Series Finals SquashInfo results

PSA World Tour seasons
2011 in squash